Wikstroemia gracilis is a shrub, of the family Thymelaeaceae.  It is native to China, specifically Hubei and Sichuan.

Description
The shrub grows up to 1.0 m tall. Its branches are very slender. It is often found in forest and shaded places on slopes at altitudes of 1100 m.

References

gracilis